Chokurdakh Airport (sometimes written Chokurdah Airport, Cokurdah Airport)  is an airport in Yakutia, Russia located 1 km north of Chokurdakh. It is a major airfield handling small transport aircraft. Google Earth imagery shows a taxiway network on the north side, a feature not common to Russian civilian airports.

Airlines and destinations

External links
 Airport Chokurdakh Aviateka.Handbook

References
RussianAirFields.com

Airports in the Arctic
Airports built in the Soviet Union
Airports in the Sakha Republic